The Bomber is a crime novel by Liza Marklund about her heroine Annika Bengtzon. It was first published in 1998. It was adapted into a 2001 film titled Deadline.

Adaptations 

 Deadline (2001), film directed by Colin Nutley

References

External links 
 

1998 Swedish novels
Novels by Liza Marklund
Swedish crime novels
Swedish novels adapted into films